Manuel Codorniu y Ferreras (1 June 1788 – 18 July 1857) was a Spanish military physician, educator and publisher who served in the Senate (1841–1843) and in the Constituent Cortes (1854–1856) of his native country.

During his lifetime, he headed several medical and political publications —including , an influential masonic newspaper that actively opposed Mexican Emperor Agustín de Iturbide in the 1820s— and started an education program in Mexico based on the works of Joseph Lancaster.

Biography

Manuel Codorniu y Ferreras was born in Esparreguera, a small town in the Province of Barcelona, Catalonia, on 1 June 1788. Both his father and grandfather were physicians, and his father, Manuel Codorniu Vidal, served as a military physician as well.

He joined the Conciliar Seminary of Barcelona in 1797 and took courses in Latin, Rhetoric, Physics, Mathematics and Metaphysics. In 1804, he graduated with a degree in Philosophy from the University of Cervera and took some courses in Pathology and clinical practice at the University of Valencia. After enrolling in a group of volunteers at the Royal University of Toledo —where courses could be accredited without examination— he returned to Cervera and graduated with a degree in Medicine in 1810.

He enlisted at the royal army when the Peninsular War broke out between Spanish monarchists and French imperial forces commanded by Napoléon Bonaparte. Carlos Nagués assigned him to the Sant Ferran Castle, where he was taken prisoner on 3 May 1811. After the conflict came to and end, he received military awards and a royal pension from King Ferdinand VII.

He joined the Overseas Army and left for the New Spain, arriving to the Port of Veracruz with liberal Viceroy Juan O'Donojú on 31 June 1821. In Mexico, he researched several endemic diseases and became actively involved in Scottish Rite masonic lodges, which at the time served as Royalist political clubs but, in contrast with the local Conservative parties, strongly resisted further influence from the Catholic Church in public affairs.

Spain's persistent refusal to recognize the Mexican independence sparked a nationalist revolt in 1827, and Mexican President Guadalupe Victoria ordered the deportation of most Spanish-born citizens. Codorniu's political enemies took advantage of the situation, sent him to a refugees' colony and made sure he abandoned the country.

Back in Spain, he was tried by the Purification Tribunal —responsible for exiles and prisoners,— found guilty and discharged from the army in 1829. In 1836, after years practicing medicine privately and volunteering in several epidemic crises, he was readmitted. A few years later, he was elected senator for Tarragona (1841–1843) and deputy for Castellón to the Constituent Cortes (1854–1856). He was grandfather of the notorious forester Ricardo Codorníu y Stárico, who led exemplary reforestations in the 19th century in southeastern Spain.

He died in Madrid on 18 July 1857, at the age of 69.

Books
 (1820)
 (1825)
 (1826)
 (1838)
 (1838)
 (1845)
 (1849)
 (1850)
 (1854)

Notes and references

Members of the Senate of Spain
Members of the Congress of Deputies (Spain)
Spanish military doctors
Physicians from Catalonia
University of Valencia alumni
People from Esparreguera
1788 births
1857 deaths
19th-century Spanish military personnel